Emmy Ruiz (born 1983/1984) is an American political advisor serving as the White House director of political strategy and outreach for President Joe Biden.

Early life and education 
Ruiz was born in Harlingen, Texas and raised in La Feria, Texas. She earned a Bachelor of Arts degree in English language and literature from the University of Texas at San Antonio.

Career 
After graduating from college, Ruiz worked as a grant writer for the American Red Cross. After meeting Hillary Clinton at a Red Cross event in 2008, she applied to work as a field organizer in Las Vegas for the Hillary Clinton 2008 presidential campaign during the 2008 Nevada Democratic presidential caucuses. During her time with the Clinton campaign, Ruiz became associated with the "Mook Mafia," a group of campaign staffers led by Robby Mook.

Ruiz was the Nevada general election director for the Barack Obama 2012 presidential campaign and managed Hillary Clinton 2016 presidential campaign efforts in Nevada, Ohio, and Colorado. In February 2019, Ruiz became a partner at NEWCO Strategies, a strategic consulting firm. During the 2020 Presidential primary, Ruiz served as a senior advisor for the Kamala Harris primary campaign. On January 5, 2021, it was announced that Ruiz would serve as White House Director of Political Strategy and Outreach in the incoming Biden administration, succeeding Brian Jack, who was the White House Director of Political Affairs.

References

External links

American political women
Biden administration personnel
Hispanic and Latino American women in politics
LGBT appointed officials in the United States
Living people
People from Cameron County, Texas
People from Harlingen, Texas
People from La Feria, Texas
Texas Democrats
University of Texas at San Antonio alumni
Year of birth missing (living people)
21st-century American women